Ysbyty Aneurin Bevan is a community hospital in Ebbw Vale, Wales.  It is managed by the Aneurin Bevan University Health Board.

History
The hospital was commissioned to replace the aging Ebbw Vale Hospital which had closed at the end of 2005. The new hospital, which was built at a cost of £53 million and stands on the site of the former Ebbw Vale Steelworks, opened in October 2010.

It was the first NHS hospital to be built in England or Wales with 100% single room, ensuite facilities to help control infection and improve privacy.

References

External links
 Ysbyty Aneurin Bevan

Aneurin Bevan University Health Board
Hospital buildings completed in 2010
Hospitals in Blaenau Gwent
NHS hospitals in Wales